Nine ships of the French Navy have borne the name Achille in honour of Greek hero Achilles:

  (1705), a 70-gun ship of the line
  (1748), a 64-gun ship of the line
  (1778), a 74-gun, was renamed Achille in 1786. She was taken in the Glorious First of June and recommissioned in the Royal Navy as  before being broken up at Plymouth in 1796.
  (1793), a fluyt
  (1803), a 74-gun  launched in 1803, which took part in the Battle of Trafalgar, where she exploded and sank.
  (1806), a ferry 
  (1827), a 90-gun , was started as Achille before being renamed
  (1848), a 90-gun Suffren-class ship of the line, was started as Achille before being renamed
  (1933–1940), a  submarine
Also, the 74-gun ship Illustre (1807), renamed to Dantzig in 1807, and to Achille in 1815.

See also

Bibliography
 

French Navy ship names